WHTS (105.3 FM), licensed to Coopersville, Michigan, is a Top 40 (CHR) radio station in the Grand Rapids, Michigan market. WHTS is owned and operated by Cumulus Media and transmits with an ERP of 20,000 watts. It is heard as far north as Tustin, as far south as Otsego, and as far east as Carson City, Michigan; under the right conditions it can be heard as far away as Clare, Michigan.

History
WHTS signed on in 1984 from its original city of license of Hart, Michigan. The call letters were WCXT and it had an effective radiated power of 100,000 watts and covered a large amount of West Michigan; although the station mentioned Hart, Muskegon, Ludington and Grand Haven in its top-of-the-hour ID, it could be heard clearly out to Manistee, Big Rapids, and Holland, and across Lake Michigan in Wisconsin. It could be heard all the way east to Portland just west of Lansing. It had various rock formats, including ABC's short-lived Z-Rock format, until 1988, when it shifted to Soft AC as "Light Mix 105.3." As an AC station, WCXT was almost completely automated and voice-tracked except for the morning show, which was hosted by Mark Waters (son of the station's owner Nancy Waters). The original owner was Waters Broadcasting.

On July 2, 1999, control of the station was transferred under an LMA (Local Marketing Agreement) to Harbor Pointe Entertainment, which then switched the format to dance CHR as "105.3 The Whip," targeting the Grand Rapids market. 105.3 The Whip consisted mostly of various dance mixes of CHR and Rhythmic CHR hits with a scattering of hits from Billboard's dance charts. A call letter change to WWIP was planned, but never happened. In the fall of 1999, the LMA was canceled due to various legal problems with Harbor Pointe Entertainment, at which time WCXT returned to the AC format under a slightly different slogan/positioner, "105-3, Your More Music Station." Other than the new slogan, the format was more or less exactly the same as before "The Whip" experiment, largely voicetracked and automated and with very few commercials.

In 2001, a construction permit for a new station on 105.3 in Mukwonago, Wisconsin (now WLVE) serving Milwaukee was given the go ahead to sign on. Because WCXT regularly DXed across Lake Michigan in the Milwaukee and Sheboygan areas, Salem Communications (which owned the now-WLVE at the time) paid the owners of WCXT to downgrade its signal from 100 kW to 28,000 watts.

In late 2004, WCXT was granted a CP to move into the Grand Rapids/Muskegon area.

In early 2005, it was announced that WCXT would be sold to Citadel Broadcasting, with speculation about what would air once the station was newly built out in Grand Rapids. In winter 2005, the format was flipped to a 100% jockless and commercial free classic country format as "Classic Country 105.3" upon Citadel's takeover of the station. This would turn out to be a filler format until the transmitter move would be finalised.

In late April 2006, the new transmitter and city of license (from Hart to Coopersville) hit the airwaves, and the station began stunting with various sound effects such as drills and hammers, accompanied by announcements that a new station is being built and that classic country had been moved to 92.5 FM (WKOQ, later changing calls to WLAW). A few days later, the stunting switched to "Reality Radio," featuring various Citadel hosts talking about the upcoming format, among other things.

On May 2, 2006 at 7:40 pm, 105.3 relaunched as Hot FM. The first song played on Hot FM was "Bad Day" by Daniel Powter. Until the midday hours of May 3, the station ran a 20–30 song loop with an extended period of dead air between the songs. This was likely due to a music load and automation problem.

The station picked up the WHTS callsign after 98.9, Rock Island, Illinois, dropped it in 2006. The old WHTS also was a top 40 station.

Citadel merged with Cumulus Media on September 16, 2011.

References

External links

Contemporary hit radio stations in the United States
HTS
Cumulus Media radio stations
Radio stations established in 1984
1984 establishments in Michigan